Little Red Riding Hood is a German film, directed by Walter Janssen, based on the story of Little Red Riding Hood by the Brothers Grimm. It should not be confused with the 1953 German film Little Red Riding Hood which is also based on the fairy tale.

Cast 
 Maren-Inken Bielenberg – Little Red Riding Hood
 Elinor von Wallerstein – The Mother
 Ellen Frank – The Grandmother
 Wolfgang Eichberger – The Hunter

Little Red Riding Hood's Brothers:
 Peter Lehmann – Bammel
 Michael Beutner – Bommel
 Rudolf Gerhofer – Bummel
 Götz Wolf – Flock
 Helge Lehmann – Flick

DVD release 
In 2007, Rotkäppchen was released on DVD in Germany.  The film was also part of five DVD boxset, which contained other classic live-action German fairytale films made in the 1950s.

External links 
 
 Kinowelt Home Entertainment DVD

1954 films
1950s fantasy films
German fantasy films
West German films
Films based on Little Red Riding Hood
German children's films
1950s German films